Wiebke Papenbrock (born 24 November 1979) is a German politician of the Social Democratic Party (SPD) who has been serving as a member of the Bundestag since 2021.

Early life and career
Papenbrock was born 1979 in East Berlin. In 2018, she received a master’s degree in Religion and Culture from the Humboldt University of Berlin.

Early in her career, Papenbrock served as a parliamentary advisor to Ernst Bahr (2006–2009) and later to Sonja Steffen (2009–2016). From 2016 until 2021, she worked for the Press and Information Office of the Federal Government.

Political career
Papenbrock entered the SPD in 2012 and became member of the Bundestag in the 2021 elections, representing the Prignitz – Ostprignitz-Ruppin – Havelland I district. 

In parliament, Papenbrock has since been serving on the Budget Committee and its Subcommittee on European Affairs. In this capacity, she is her parliamentary group’s rapporteur on the annual budget of the Federal Foreign Office. She is also a member of the so-called Confidential Committee (Vertrauensgremium) of the Budget Committee, which provides budgetary supervision for Germany's three intelligence services, BND, BfV and MAD.

See also 

 List of members of the 20th Bundestag

References 

Living people
1979 births
People from Berlin
Social Democratic Party of Germany politicians
Members of the Bundestag 2021–2025
21st-century German politicians
21st-century German women politicians
Female members of the Bundestag

Members of the Bundestag for Brandenburg